Pirámides station is a Madrid Metro station in Madrid city centre. It was opened on 5 June 1968 and is one of the oldest stations on Line 5 of the Madrid Metro. It gives access to the Vicente Calderón Stadium, home to the Atlético Madrid football club, and is located in fare Zone A. The station also offers interchange with Cercanías Madrid via Pirámides railway station.

References

Line 5 (Madrid Metro) stations
Railway stations in Spain opened in 1968
Railway stations in Madrid
Cercanías Madrid stations